Commission on Population and Development refers to the United Nations Commission on Population and Development. It may also refer to:
 Commission on Population and Development (Philippines)